Jackson Sheringham (born 22 June 1988) is a professional Australian rules football player who played for  in the Australian Football League (AFL). He was recruited by the club in the 2012 Rookie Draft, with pick #36. Sheringham made his debut in Round 16, 2012, against  at the Melbourne Cricket Ground. He was delisted at the conclusion of the 2014 AFL season.

References

External links
 
 

1988 births
Living people
Geelong Football Club players
Australian rules footballers from Victoria (Australia)
Geelong Falcons players